The Canton of Faulquemont is a French administrative division, located in the Moselle département (Grand Est région).

Composition 
Since the French canton reorganisation which came into effect in March 2015, the communes of the canton of Faulquemont are:

Adaincourt	
Adelange 	
Ancerville
Arraincourt 	
Arriance 	
Aube
Bambiderstroff 	
Béchy
Beux
Boucheporn
Buchy
Chanville
Cheminot
Chérisey
Créhange 	
Elvange	
Faulquemont	
Flétrange
Fleury
Flocourt
Fouligny 	
Goin 
Guinglange	
Hallering 	
Han-sur-Nied 	
Haute-Vigneulles 	
Hémilly 	
Herny 	
Holacourt 	
Laudrefang	
Lemud
Liéhon
Longeville-lès-Saint-Avold 	
Louvigny
Luppy
Mainvillers 	
Many 	
Marange-Zondrange 	
Orny
Pagny-lès-Goin
Pommérieux
Pontoy
Pontpierre 	
Pournoy-la-Grasse
Rémilly
Sillegny
Silly-en-Saulnois
Solgne
Teting-sur-Nied 	
Thicourt 	
Thimonville
Thonville 	
Tragny
Tritteling-Redlach 	
Vahl-lès-Faulquemont 	
Vatimont 	
Verny
Villers-Stoncourt
Vittoncourt 	
Voimhaut 
Zimming

See also
Cantons of the Moselle department
Communes of the Moselle department

References

Cantons of Moselle (department)